The World Auto Co., Ltd. is the official general importer and car assembly plant for Volkswagen located in the Ho Chi Minh City.

The company was founded in 2006 and is responsible for the supply of five contracted dealers. The plant of the company is located in the Vinashin-Shinec Industrial Area of Hải Phòng which covers an area of 100 hectares. Investors from five countries, including Japan, South Korea, Netherlands and Sweden had provided a total sum of 120 million U.S. dollars for the building of the plant. The final contracts for the joint venture were signed in April 2007.

Lineup

Current

Former

External links
Official website of World Auto

Car manufacturers of Vietnam
Vehicle manufacturing companies established in 2006